The Mount Washington Hillclimb Auto Race, also known as the Climb to the Clouds, is a timed hillclimb auto race up the Mount Washington Auto Road to the summit of Mount Washington in New Hampshire. It is one of the oldest auto races in the country, first run on July 11 and 12, 1904, predating the Indianapolis 500 and the Pikes Peak Hill Climb. The event was revived in 2011 and was held again in 2014 and 2017.

History
The Mount Washington Hill Climb Auto Race was held off and on from 1904 to 1961, then not again until 1990, when Howie Wemyss, manager of the Auto Road, Robert Brotherus, a Finnish rally driver, and 11-time Sports Car Club of America (SCCA) ProRally champion, John Buffum, brought the race back.

Originally created by early auto manufacturers to showcase their vehicles, the Auto Road was chosen to prove the ability of these "horseless carriages". The inaugural  "Climb to the Clouds" featured many makes of cars including Rambler, Mercedes, Oldsmobile, Stanley Steamer, Pierce, and a single Daimler, which were placed in categories based on their price. Although the Daimler and the Stanley Steamer driven by F. E. Stanley were favored, Harry Harkness drove to victory in a Mercedes, which ascended the  course in 24 minutes, 37 seconds. This was quite impressive compared to the 2 hours, 10 minutes it took the first automobile to climb the Auto Road in 1899, a Stanley Locomobile.

The event was won by Erwin "Cannonball" Baker in 1928 with a time of 14 minutes, 49.6 seconds, driving a Franklin. Ab Jenkins won in 1930. Baker won again in 1932. Carroll Shelby drove a specially prepared Ferrari roadster to a record run of 10 minutes 21.8 seconds on his way to victory in 1956. In 1961, Bill Rutan drove a Porsche Carrera-powered Volkswagen to set a record time of 9:13.0, which stood until the race returned in 1990. Upon the race's return, Tim O'Neil set a time of 7:45, driving a VW Golf rally car. The current record is 5 minutes, 28.67 seconds, set in 2021 by Travis Pastrana driving a Subaru WRX STI; this broke his previous record of 5 minutes, 44.72 seconds set in 2017. The prior record holder was David Higgins of the Isle of Man, also driving a WRX STI, with a time of 6 minutes, 9.09 seconds set in 2014. This record held until 2011 while driving the same car, he broke his own record clocking  2 days before his 69th birthday. Travis Pastrana reached speeds of 130mph.

In 2004 the event was restarted as a historic event, with emphasis placed on vintage cars.

Prior to the event's return in 2011, the last fullblown hillclimb race was in 2001, won by Paul Choiniere with a time of 4:59.73 on a weather-shortened course in his 500 hp methanol-fueled, all wheel drive Hyundai Tiburon.

The 2014 running of Climb to the Clouds included the first electric race car to compete in the history of this event. EVSR, the fully electric racecar created by Entropy Racing, was piloted by Tim O'Neil, former overall hill record holder, to a time of 7:28. O'Neil bested his previous overall hill record by 16 seconds and put his mark onto Mt. Washington once more by setting the fastest electric record.

Key: R = Course record

See also
 Giants Despair Hillclimb
 Hillclimbing in the United States
 Pikes Peak International Hill Climb
 Mount Washington Road Race
 Mount Washington Auto Road Bicycle Hillclimb

References

External links

 New England Hillclimb Association

Hillclimbs
Auto races in the United States
Hillclimb Auto Race
Recurring sporting events established in 1904
Tourist attractions in Coös County, New Hampshire
Motorsport in New Hampshire
1904 establishments in New Hampshire